New Town Secondary School is a co-educational government secondary school located along Dover Road in Ghim Moh, Singapore.

History
New Town Secondary School was initially located in Queensway. At the start, it was known as Queensway's Third Secondary School (the other two being Queensway and Queenstown Secondary Schools), aimed in providing English-medium education to the children of Queenstown residents. It was then officially named New Town Secondary School in mid-1965. When the school first started, it had an intake of more than 1,800 students in 45 classes, across Secondary 1 to 4.

New Town Secondary School was officially opened on 17 September 1966 by Labour Minister Jek Yeun Thong.

In 1969, New Town Secondary School merged with the neighbouring Baharuddin Vocational School, doubling the size of its school compound and increasing its students intake to more than 3,000.

By the mid-1970s, New Town Secondary School was the largest secondary school in Singapore.

In 1974, a 400-metre bitumen athletic track was constructed.

In 1998, it moved to its current site at Dover Road. A tree was removed and shifted to the new Dover Road campus as part of the symbolic move.

In 2015, the school celebrated its 50th anniversary.

In 2021, the Ministry of Education announced that the school will be merged with Tanglin Secondary School in 2023.

In 2023,Tanglin Secondary School and New Town Secondary merged under the name NEW TOWN SECONDARY SCHOOL at New Town Secondary School’s campus.A new logo and uniform was designed following the merger.

Facilities

Co-Curricular activities (CCAs) offered

Student Councillor
There are 3 committees in the Student Council. Student Discipline committee, Welfare committee and School Events committee with each committee having up to 2 heads at a time. Each committee discharges its own duties honourably. The student council mainly deals with the planning of school-wide events and maintaining of discipline

Peer Support Leader
Similarly to Student Councillors,There are 4 committees in it. Student Discipline committee, Welfare committee, School Events committee and Class Cohesion committee with each committee having up to 1 head at a time. Each committee discharges its own duties honourably. The Peer Support Leaders mainly deal with instilling emotional support upon students.

Becoming a Student Councillor/Peer Support Leader
To become a Student Councillor or a peer support leader, one must first be nominated by either a teacher, peer or by themselves and after which, they are interviewed. If the interview is successful, they are able to become a Probationary Student Councillor or a Peer Support Leader where they are closely monitored for 6 to 12 months to see if they are fit to be in such position. If so, they then can finally become a Student Councillor.

School Distinctive Programmes
Learning for Life (LLP)
Applied Learning (ALP)
Enhanced Art (EAP)

Awards

Notable alumni
 Teo Ho Pin, former member of parliament for Bukit Panjang SMC

See also
 Education in Singapore

References

External links
 School website

Secondary schools in Singapore
Educational institutions established in 1965
Queenstown, Singapore
Dover, Singapore
Schools in Central Region, Singapore
1965 establishments in Singapore